Ab Sheykh (also Romanized as Āb Sheykh and Āb-e Sheykh) is a village in Pol Beh Pain Rural District, Simakan District, Jahrom County, Fars Province, Iran. At the 2006 census, its population was 298, in 67 families.

References 

Populated places in Jahrom County